"Crazy for Your Love" is a song written by J.P. Pennington and Sonny LeMaire, and recorded by American country music group Exile.  It was released in November 1984 as the second single from the album Kentucky Hearts.  The song was Exile's fourth number one country hit.  The single went to number one for one week.

The B-side, "Just in Case", was later a number 1 hit for The Forester Sisters in 1985.

Charts

Weekly charts

Year-end charts

References

1984 singles
Exile (American band) songs
Songs written by J.P. Pennington
Song recordings produced by Buddy Killen
Epic Records singles
1984 songs
Songs written by Sonny LeMaire